A bawley was an English sailing vessel typified by a boomless cutter rig and probably named for having a boiler for cooking shrimp in amidships. "The majority were built by Aldous of Brightlingsea", but they were also built in Harwich, Erith, Southend, Leigh, and on the Medway.

References

External links 

 Bona — 36 ft bawley Bona (LO178), built 1903 by Aldous in Brightlingsea, Essex
 Saxonia  — a Brightlingsea Bawley built in 1930
 Emma — pre-1850 Essex Bawley

Sailboat types
Types of fishing vessels